Joan Freeman (born 2 April 1958) is an Irish psychologist, mental health activist and an Independent politician who served as a Senator from 2016 to 2020, after being nominated by the then Taoiseach, Enda Kenny. She is the founder of Pieta House, a national mental health services charity. She resigned from Pieta House in 2014. She was an unsuccessful candidate in the 2018 presidential election.

Pieta House
Freeman is the founder of Pieta House, a suicide intervention charity established in 2006 in Lucan, County Dublin. Since 2006, Pieta House has established twelve additional centres across Ireland with almost 270 therapists and administration staff, providing free therapeutic services to over 30,000 people. In 2008, Freeman founded the annual fund-raising event Darkness into Light in aid of Pieta House. Begun with 400 participants, approximately 200,000 people participated in the May 2018 recent iteration of the event. The 5 km walk took place across 180 venues worldwide. Then Taoiseach Leo Varadkar was among the 15,000 people who undertook the walk in Dublin's Phoenix Park.

Freeman resigned from Pieta House in 2014, in order to concentrate on developing Solace House, a similar charity based in New York City launched in 2015. The service was initially created to serve the Irish diaspora in New York, but has since supported and counselled people from many different nationalities.

Political career
In 2016, Freeman was nominated by then Taoiseach, Enda Kenny, as a member of Seanad Éireann. She helped form, and now chairs, Ireland's first Committee on the Future of Mental Healthcare. She is also a member of the Joint Committee on Children and Youth Affairs. She is a former member of the Council for Justice and Peace of the Irish Catholic Bishops' Conference, at one time speaking to raise awareness on suicide prevention training programmes provided by Pieta House.

Freeman received the nomination of four councils required to be a candidate in the 2018 presidential election. The incumbent President Michael D. Higgins was running for re-election and an election was held on 26 October 2018.

The Times described Freeman as having "strong family links with the anti-abortion movement". Her sister, Theresa Lowe, and her niece, Maria Steen, argued for a No vote in the referendum to repeal the Eighth Amendment on televised debates on RTÉ and TV3. Steen is a member of the Iona Institute. Freeman has said that although she voted No in the referendum, she "would be happy to carry the voice of the people and sign resulting legislation into law as president" and noted her daughter's involvement in the Yes campaign. Independent TD Mattie McGrath will support Freeman if she runs, stating that "a good Catholic president would be refreshing". If elected, Freeman has said she will set up a "National Assembly of Well-being".

During the campaign, the Irish Independent reported on a speech by Freeman in which she claimed that her eczema had been miraculously cured following a visit to Knock Shrine when she was a teenager.

Personal life
Freeman is a native of Dublin. The sixth of the eight children of Marie and John Lowe, she lived in Warwickshire, England, where her parents moved when she was a baby. Her family returned to Dublin when she was 12, and her father took up a job managing his brother's pub, The Sword, on Camden Street.

She is married to Patrick Freeman and has four children. She holds a degree and MA in psychology. In June 2018, Freeman received the Trailblazer Award from the Women's Executive Network, Ireland. In 2019, Trinity College Dublin awarded her with an honorary doctorate.

References

1958 births
Living people
Members of the 25th Seanad
21st-century women members of Seanad Éireann
Irish humanitarians
Irish psychologists
Irish women psychologists
Independent members of Seanad Éireann
Nominated members of Seanad Éireann
Politicians from Dublin (city)
Candidates for President of Ireland
People associated with Trinity College Dublin
People from Dublin (city) in health professions